Stenothoidae is a family of arthropods in the order Amphipoda.

Genera
Incertae sedis
Sudanea Krapp-Schickel, 2015
Subfamily Stenothoinae Boeck, 1871
Aurometopa Barnard & Karaman, 1987
Goratelson Barnard, 1972
Hardametopa Barnard & Karaman, 1991
Knysmetopa Barnard & Karaman, 1987
Kyphometopa Krapp-Schickel, 2013
Ligulodactylus Krapp-Schickel, 2013
Malvinometopa Krapp-Schickel, 2011
Mesometopa Guryanova, 1938
Mesoproboloides Gurjanova, 1938
Metopa Boeck, 1871
Metopella Stebbing, 1906
Metopelloides Gurjanova, 1938
Metopoides Della Valle, 1893
Parametopa Chevreux, 1901
Parametopella Gurjanova, 1938
Paraprobolisca Ren in Ren & Huang, 1991
Probolisca Gurjanova, 1938
Proboloides Della Valle, 1893
Prometopa Schellenberg, 1926
Prostenothoe Gurjanova, 1938
Sandrothoe Krapp-Schickel, 2006
Scaphodactylus Rauschert & Andres, 1993
Stenothoe Dana, 1852
Stenothoides Chevreux, 1900
Stenula Barnard, 1962
Synkope Krapp-Schickel, 1999
Torometopa Barnard & Karaman, 1987
Victometopa Krapp-Schickel, 2011
Vonimetopa Barnard & Karaman, 1987
Wallametopa Barnard, 1974
Zaikometopa Barnard & Karaman, 1987
Subfamily Thaumatelsoninae Gurjanova, 1938
Antatelson Barnard, 1972
Ausatelson Barnard, 1972
Chuculba Barnard, 1974
Parathaumatelson Gurjanova, 1938
Prothaumatelson Schellenberg, 1931
Pseudothaumatelson Schellenberg, 1931
Ptychotelson Krapp-Schickel, 2000
Pycnopyge Krapp-Schickel, 2000
Raukumara Krapp-Schickel, 2000
Raumahara Barnard, 1972
Thaumatelson Walker, 1906
Thaumatelsonella Rauschert & Andres, 1991
Verticotelson Krapp-Schickel, 2006
Yarra Krapp-Schickel, 2000

References

Amphipoda
Crustacean families